Theronia atalantae is a species of ichneumon wasp in the family Ichneumonidae.

Subspecies
These four subspecies belong to the species Theronia atalantae:
 Theronia atalantae atalantae g
 Theronia atalantae fulvescens (Cresson, 1865) b
 Theronia atalantae gestator (Thunberg, 1822) c g
 Theronia atalantae himalayensis Gupta, 1983 c g
Data sources: i = ITIS, c = Catalogue of Life, g = GBIF, b = Bugguide.net

References

Further reading

External links

 

Pimplinae
Insects described in 1761
Taxa named by Nikolaus Poda von Neuhaus